ʻUhilamoelangi Fasi is a Tongan politician and academic.

He worked as chair of the Pacific Community's Pacific Qualifications Advisory Board. He was first elected to the Legislative Assembly of Tonga in the 2021 Tongan general election, winning the Tongatapu 2 seat from Semisi Sika.

References

Living people
Year of birth missing (living people)

Members of the Legislative Assembly of Tonga

Tongan academics
Independent politicians in Tonga